Local elections were held in Mandaue City on May 9, 2022 within the Philippine general election. Registered voters of the city will be electing candidates for the following elective local posts: mayor, vice mayor, district representative, and twelve councilors. The city has its own congressional district.

Mayoralty and vice mayoralty elections

Mayor 
Incumbent mayor Jonas Cortes is vying for a second term. He is running against former city councilor Nilo Seno.

Vice mayor 
Incumbent vice mayor Glenn Bercede is vying for a second term. He is running against former city councilor Elmer Cabahug. Also running is Gepind Requierme.

District representative 
Incumbent representative of 6th congressional district Emmarie Ouano-Dizon is vying to become the first representative of the newly-created lone district of Mandaue City and is running unopposed.

City Council 

Incumbents are expressed in italics.

By ticket

Partido Demokratiko Pilipino-Lakas ng Bayan/Team Mandaue

Nationalist People's Coalition/Bag-ong Mandaue

Independent

By district 
Key: Italicized: incumbent

References 

2022 Philippine local elections
Elections in Cebu
May 2022 events in the Philippines